Ernest Becker (September 27, 1924 – March 6, 1974) was an American cultural anthropologist and author of the 1974 Pulitzer Prize-winning book, The Denial of Death.

Biography

Early life
Ernest Becker was born in Springfield, Massachusetts, to Jewish immigrant parents. Serving in the infantry during World War II, he would help liberate a Nazi concentration camp. Once completing his military service, Becker attended Syracuse University in New York. Upon graduation he joined the U.S. Embassy in Paris as an administrative officer.

In his early 30s, he returned to Syracuse University to pursue graduate studies in cultural anthropology, and would complete his PhD in 1960. The first of his nine books, Zen: A Rational Critique (1961) was based on his doctoral dissertation.

Professional career

After graduating from Syracuse University in 1960, Becker began “the short 14-year period of his professional career”
as a professor and writer. Initially, he taught anthropology in the Department of Psychiatry at the Upstate Medical College in Syracuse, New York, but was summarily fired, along with other non-tenured professors, for supporting tenured Professor Thomas Szasz in a dispute with the administration over academic freedom. After a year in Italy, Becker was hired back at Syracuse University, this time in the School of Education.

In 1965, Becker acquired a lecturer position at the University of California, Berkeley in the anthropology program. However, trouble again arose between Becker and the administration, leading to his departure from the university. At the time, thousands of students petitioned to keep Becker at the school and offered to pay his salary, but the petition did not succeed in retaining Becker. In 1967, he taught at San Francisco State's Department of Psychology until January 1969 when he resigned in protest against the administration's stringent policies against student demonstrations.

In 1969, Becker began a professorship at Simon Fraser University in Burnaby, British Columbia, where he would spend the remaining years of his academic life. During the next five years, he wrote his 1974 Pulitzer Prize-winning work, The Denial of Death. Additionally, he worked on the second edition to The Birth and Death of Meaning, and wrote Escape from Evil.

Becker's insistence on interdisciplinary work, along with the fact that students flocked to his lectures, which were marked by a high level of theatricality, did not endear him to many of his colleagues. Referring to his insistence on the importance symbolism plays in the human animal, he wrote, "I have tried to correct... bias by showing how deep theatrical 'superficialities' really go."

Death
In November 1972, Ernest Becker was diagnosed with colon cancer. Two years later, on 6 March 1974, he would pass away at the age of 49 in Burnaby, British Columbia. Shortly before his death, he participated in a series of interviews with Sam Keen for Psychology Today.

Ideas and concepts

As mentioned above, Becker did not attain tenure when he was fired from his first academic position at Upstate Medical College in Syracuse, NY. This was a result of a dispute the school had with "anti-psychiatrist" Thomas Szasz, with whom Becker sided. This may be the reason Szasz's views are sometimes imputed to Becker. However, Becker's support of Szasz was limited to the issue of academic freedom: that is, whether or not Szasz (who had tenure) had the right to teach his views to psychiatry students.

During the final decade of his relatively short life, Becker used the ideas and concepts from many different writers and thinkers to write his books and teach his classes. To list just a few of these thinkers who helped formulate many of his theories, many point to how Becker draws on the work of Søren Kierkegaard, Sigmund Freud, Wilhelm Reich, Norman O. Brown, Erich Fromm, Georg Wilhelm Friedrich Hegel, and especially Otto Rank.

The Birth and Death of Meaning 
The Birth and Death of Meaning, written in 1962 and revised in 1971, was “Becker’s first attempt to explain the human condition.” It takes its title from the concept of mankind progressing from simple-minded ape to a world of symbols and illusions, and then deconstructing those illusions through our own evolving intellect.

Revolution in Psychiatry 
During this early period, Becker was formulating a "fully transactional" view of mental health that eventually formed the basis for his book, Revolution in Psychiatry (1964). Although Szasz is cited on a few key points in this book, Becker pursues a very distinct path.

The Denial of Death 
In his 1973 book The Denial of Death, Becker came to believe that an individual's character is essentially formed around the process of denying one's own mortality, that this denial is a necessary component of functioning in the world, and that this character-armor masks and obscures genuine self-knowledge. Much of the evil in the world, he believed, was a consequence of this need to deny death.

Escape From Evil 
Becker eventually came to the position that psychological inquiry can only bring us to a distinct threshold beyond which belief systems must be invoked to satisfy the human psyche. The reach of such a perspective consequently encompasses science and religion, even to what Sam Keen suggests is Becker's greatest achievement, the writing of Escape from Evil, left unfinished at the time of his death, but posthumously published in 1975.

Influence and legacy

Two months following his death, Becker was awarded a Pulitzer Prize for his book, The Denial of Death (1973), posthumously gaining him wider recognition. Escape From Evil (1975) was intended as a significant extension of the line of reasoning begun in The Denial of Death, developing the social and cultural implications of the concepts explored in the earlier book. Although the manuscript's second half was left unfinished at the time of his death, it was completed from the manuscript that existed as well as from notes on the unfinished chapter.

Becker's work, particularly as expressed in his later books, The Denial of Death and Escape from Evil, have had a significant impact on social psychology and the psychology of religion. Terror management theory, an important research programme in social psychology that has spawned over 200 published studies has turned Becker's views on the cultural influence of death anxiety into a scientific theory that helps to explain such diverse human phenomena as self-esteem, prejudice, and religion.

After his death, the Ernest Becker Foundation was founded, focused on multidisciplinary inquiries into human behavior. The foundation would focus on reducing violence in human society, using Becker's basic ideas to support research and application at the interfaces of science, the humanities, social action, and religion.

Flight From Death (2003) is a documentary film directed by Patrick Shen, based on Becker's work, and partially funded by the Ernest Becker Foundation.

Works

Books 
1961. Zen: A Rational Critique. New York: W. W. Norton.
1962. The Birth and Death of Meaning: An Interdisciplinary Perspective in Psychiatry and Anthropology (1st ed.). New York: The Free Press of Glencoe.
1964. Revolution in Psychiatry: The New Understanding of Man. New York: Free Press.
1967. Beyond Alienation: A Philosophy of Education for the Crisis of Democracy. New York: George Braziller.
1968. The Structure of Evil: An Essay on the Unification of the Science of Man. New York: George Braziller.
1969. Angel in Armor: A Post-Freudian Perspective on the Nature of Man. New York: George Braziller.
This book is a collection of shorter essays, lectures, and reviews written between 1962 and 1968.
1971. The Lost Science of Man. New York: George Braziller.
1971. The Birth and Death of Meaning: An Interdisciplinary Perspective on the Problem of Man (2nd ed.). New York: Free Press.
1973. The Denial of Death. New York: Free Press.
1975. Escape from Evil. New York: Free Press.

Essays 
 1974. “The spectrum of loneliness.” Humanitas 10:237–46.
 1974. “Toward the merger of animal and human studies.” Philosophy of the Social Sciences 4:235–54.

References

Further reading

Books on Becker 
 Evans, Ron. 1992. The Creative Myth and the Cosmic Hero: Text and Context in Ernest Becker's 'The Denial of Death'''. New York: Peter Lang.
 Kagen, Michael Alan. 1994. Educating Heroes: The Implications of Ernest Becker's Depth Psychology of Education for Philosophy of Education. Durango, CO: Hollowbrook Publishing.
 Kenel, Sally A. 1988. Mortal Gods: Ernest Becker and Fundamental Theology. Lanham, MD: University Press of America.
 Leifer, Ronald, 1976. “Becker, Ernest.” In The Encyclopedia of the Social Sciences 18. New York: Macmillan/Free Press.
 Liechty, Daniel, ed. 2005. The Ernest Becker Reader. University of Washington Press. 
 — 2002. Death and Denial: Interdisciplinary Perspectives on the Legacy of Ernest Becker. Praeger. .
 Martin, Stephen W. 1997. Decomposing Modernity: Ernest Becker's Images of Humanity at the End of an Age. Lanham, MD: University Press of America.
 Streeter, J. 2009. Human Nature, Human Evil, and Religion: Ernest Becker and Christian Theology. Lanham, MD: University Press of America. .

 Essays on Becker 
 Bates, Harvey. 1977. “Letters from Ernest.” Christian Century 9:217–27.
 
 Keen, Sam. 1974. “A Conversation with Ernest Becker.” Psychology Today (April):71–80.
 Liechty, Daniel. 2004 [1998]. "An Ernest Becker Bibliography." Zygon 33(1):87–90. .
 Martin, Jack. “Ernest Becker at Simon Fraser University (1969-1974)” Journal of Humanistic Psychology'' 54(1):66–112. .

External links

 The Ernest Becker Foundation
 Ernest Becker Listserv Archive (Inactive Now July 2009)
Finding aid to the Ernest Becker papers at Columbia University. Rare Book & Manuscript Library
 Encyclopedia of Death and Dying
 "Introduction" to The Ernest Becker Reader (2005) by Daniel Liechty
 What Drives People To Behave The Way They Do? (an introductory guide about Ernest Becker's ideas)
 Why Do People Need Self-Esteem? A Theoretical and Empirical Review

1924 births
1974 deaths
20th-century American non-fiction writers
20th-century American psychologists
Anti-psychiatry
Cultural anthropologists
Deaths from cancer in British Columbia
Deaths from colorectal cancer
Existential therapists
Jewish American social scientists
Jewish American writers
Pulitzer Prize for General Non-Fiction winners
20th-century American anthropologists
20th-century American Jews